William Clyde Handlin (April 11, 1885 – January 12, 1953) was an American football coach. He served as the head football coach at Pacific University in Forest Grove, Oregon in 1916, compiling a record of 2–3. Handlin was a graduate of the University of Illinois and later served as the superintendent of schools at New Holland, Illinois.  He taught science and coaches sports at Lincoln High School in Lincoln, Illinois from 1911 to 1916.  After working overseas with the YMCA during World War I, Handlin return to Lincoln High School in 1919 as principal. He served in that capacity until his death there on January 12, 1953.

Head coaching record

References

External links
 

1885 births
1953 deaths
20th-century American educators
Pacific Boxers football coaches
People from Logan County, Illinois
Educators from Illinois